Anthea Dorine Stewart (born November 20, 1944) is a former field hockey player who was a member of the Zimbabwe national women's team that won the gold medal at the 1980 Summer Olympics in Moscow. Previously, she had represented South Africa between 1963 and 1974.

Because of the boycott of the United States and other countries, only one team was available to compete in the women's field hockey tournament: the hosting USSR team. A late request was sent to the government of Zimbabwe, which quickly assembled a team less than a week before the competition started. To everyone's surprise, they won, claiming Zimbabwe's only medal in the 1980 Games.  Not only was it Zimbabwe's only medal, it was the first medal given for women's field hockey in Olympic history.

Stewart is the mother of international diver Evan Stewart, who competed in three consecutive Summer Olympics for his native country, starting in 1992 in Barcelona, Spain.

References

External links

1944 births
Living people
People from Blantyre
South African female field hockey players
Zimbabwean female field hockey players
Olympic field hockey players of Zimbabwe
Field hockey players at the 1980 Summer Olympics
Olympic gold medalists for Zimbabwe
Olympic medalists in field hockey
Medalists at the 1980 Summer Olympics
White Zimbabwean sportspeople
Zimbabwean people of British descent
South African people of British descent
Malawian people of British descent